Crocker Range National Park was established in 1984, although the area had previously been under protection as a forest reserve. It covers the north-south Crocker Range, of 1200-1800 metre mountains in Sabah, Malaysia. In the vicinity of park headquarters, there is a resort that provides accommodation and food services. Other visitors facilities such as an exhibition centre, insectarium, fernarium, observation tower and trekking trail can also be found.

The park covers 1,399 km², making it the largest park in Sabah. The park consists of both hill and mountain forest, with many species of flora and fauna endemic to Borneo. Maintenance of this forest cover is essential to ensuring a pure water supply for many of the towns and communities in Sabah.

The park contains at least five species of primates, such as the orang-utan, gibbons and the furry tarsier with its enormous round eyes, and extremely sociable long-tailed macaques.  The Padas River bisects the range between Beaufort and Tenom.

Crocker Range Park is administered by Sabah Parks.

See also
 List of national parks of Malaysia

External links

Sabah Parks
Manis Manis Rooftop of Borneo Resort

Crocker Range
National parks of Sabah
Protected areas established in 1984
1984 establishments in Malaysia
Borneo montane rain forests
Borneo lowland rain forests